Ian Brick is a former Kerry hurler and cricketer from Kilmoyley County Kerry.

References
http://www.sportsfile.com/id/119805/
http://www.sportsfile.com/id/004822/

Kerry inter-county hurlers
Munster inter-provincial hurlers
Kilmoyley hurlers
Ardfert Gaelic footballers
Living people
Year of birth missing (living people)